Chaudhry Ahmad Saeed (11 January 1941 – 28 September 2018) was the former chairman of the Pakistan's national carrier, Pakistan International Airlines. He resigned that position in 2005. He was also the former Chairman of Zarai Taraqiati Bank Limited. He was also the chairman of Shalamar Hospital.

He served as chairman and director for Servis Industries Limited, Pakistan-based conglomerate dealing in manufacturing and retailing of footwear and textiles. His brother Chaudhry Ahmad Mukhtar was cabinet member from Pakistan Peoples Party.

His son in law Amer Ali Ahmed is the Former Deputy Commissioner and Current Chief Commissioner Islamabad as well as the Chairman CDA. His second son-in-law, Mustafa Ramday has served as Advocate general of Punjab, his other son-in-law being Malik Amin Aslam, advisor to PM Imran Khan. Ch Ahmad Saeed has five children, Arif Saeed, Omar Saeed, Asma Ramday, Amina Amin, and Zara Ahmed. He took Pakistan International Airlines to a whole new level. He was well known man in many industries due to his success.

Chaudhry Ahmad Saeed had been known to be supporting hundreds of needy institutions and donating generously towards the welfare of Pakistan. He was a great philanthropist in his time. He was also one of the most generous donors for Forman Christian College. He had studied there himself. He said what he thought was right. He was a man of his word, and always had the courage to admit anything and everything. He was the cleanest and most humble soul, giving his mother's best dress to his gardener for his daughter's wedding. His mother's anger was then converted into love after hearing what he had done. He supplied shoes to needy children and always used to be doing something or the other for the citizens of Pakistan.
Website

Positions held
Servis Industries Limited (former Chairman)
Agricultural Development Bank (former Chairman)
Pakistan International Airlines (Managing Director and Chairman - 2001 to 2005)
Pakistan Cycling Federation (President)
Pakistan Bodybuilding Federation (President)
Zarai Taraqiati Bank Limited (President)

Death and survivors
His wife's name is Nighat Saeed. Both his sons (Arif Saeed and Omar Saeed) continue his business, while his daughter (Asma Ramday) runs a very well-known restaurant called The Polo Lounge he also has two daughters Zara Ahmed and Amna Amin. He has thirteen grandchildren namely, Shamsher Aslam, Hussain Aslam, Sarah Aslam, Natalia Saeed, Nafisa Saeed, Hamza Saeed, Ahmad Saeed, Noor Saeed, Ayesha Saeed, Amnaan Ramday, Zenab Ahmed, and Faraz Ahmed.

He suffered from heart problems and other sicknesses. The actual cause of his death has not yet been worked out by the doctors. Most say that he died of multi-organ failure. He died at Aga Khan University Hospital, Karachi on Friday, 28 September 2018. His funeral prayer was led by (former) Justice Khalil-ur-Rehman Ramday.

Awards and recognition
Sitara-i-Imtiaz (Star of Excellence) Award by the President of Pakistan in 2006
 Honorary doctorate degree was awarded to him by Forman Christian College for his services to that college in 2012

References

1941 births
2018 deaths
Forman Christian College alumni
Pakistani industrialists
Pakistan International Airlines people
Pakistani chief executives
Pakistani businesspeople
Pakistani philanthropists
Punjabi people
Recipients of Sitara-i-Imtiaz
Service Industries Limited
20th-century philanthropists